Iddaru Asadhyule is a 1979 Indian Telugu-language action film starring Krishna, Rajinikanth, Geetha and Madhavi in the lead roles. It was directed by K. S. R. Das and music was composed by Chellapilla Satyam.

Plot

Janaki is wife of a Sepoy. She stays in a village with her son and daughter. One night a drunkard tried to molest her. Her son kills him  with axe.

Cast

References

External links
 Iddaru Asadhyule movie online

1979 films
Films directed by K. S. R. Das
Films scored by Satyam (composer)
1970s Telugu-language films